Mount Morris is an unincorporated community and census-designated place (CDP) in Greene County, Pennsylvania, United States. It is located in Perry Township, near I-79. As of the 2010 census, the population was 737.

Geography
Mount Morris is located at  (39.733135, -80.067842), on Interstate 79 near the West Virginia state line.

Demographics

Places of interest
The track hosts races in the AMA Motocross Championships series, including the High Point Nationals held each Father's Day weekend. Also known for having authentic Native American trails.

Notable person
 Joseph Benton Donley (1838–1917), U.S. congressman

References

Census-designated places in Pennsylvania
Census-designated places in Greene County, Pennsylvania